Cycas semota is a species of cycad. It is native to Queensland, where it is confined to the northern Cape York Peninsula.

References

semota
Endemic flora of Queensland